Sir Max Hugh Macdonald Hastings  (born 28 December 1945) is a British journalist and military historian, who has worked as a foreign correspondent for the BBC, editor-in-chief of The Daily Telegraph, and editor of the Evening Standard. He is also the author of thirty books, most significantly histories, which have won several major awards. Hastings currently writes a bimonthly column for Bloomberg Opinion and contributes to The Times and The Sunday Times.

Early life
Hastings' parents were Macdonald Hastings, a journalist and correspondent, and Anne Scott-James, sometime editor of Harper's Bazaar. He was educated at Charterhouse and University College, Oxford, which he left after a year.

Career 
Hastings moved to the United States, spending a year (1967–68) as a Fellow of the World Press Institute, following which he published his first book, America, 1968: The Fire This Time, an account of the US in its tumultuous election year. He became a foreign correspondent and reported from more than sixty countries and eleven wars for BBC1's Twenty-Four Hours current affairs programme and for the Evening Standard in London.

Hastings was the first person accompanying the British Task Force to enter Port Stanley on the last day of the 1982 Falklands War. After ten years as editor and then editor-in-chief of The Daily Telegraph, he returned to the Evening Standard as editor in 1996 and remained there until his retirement in 2002. Hastings was appointed a Knight Bachelor in the 2002 Birthday Honours for services to journalism. He was elected a member of the political dining society known as The Other Club in 1993.

He has presented historical documentaries for the BBC and is the author of many books, including Bomber Command, which earned the Somerset Maugham Award for non-fiction in 1980. Both Overlord and The Battle for the Falklands won the Yorkshire Post Book of the Year prize. He was named Journalist of the Year and Reporter of the Year at the 1982 British Press Awards, and Editor of the Year in 1988. In 2010 he received the Royal United Services Institute's Westminster Medal for his "lifelong contribution to military literature", and the same year the Edgar Wallace Award from the London Press Club.

In 2012, he was awarded the US$100,000 Pritzker Military Library Literature Award, a lifetime achievement award for military writing, which includes an honorarium, citation and medallion, sponsored by the Chicago-based Tawani Foundation. Hastings is a Fellow of the Royal Society of Literature, and the Royal Historical Society. He was President of the Campaign to Protect Rural England from 2002 to 2007.

In his 2007 book Nemesis: The Battle for Japan, 1944–45 (known as Retribution in the United States), the chapter on Australia's role in the last year of the Pacific War was criticised by the chief of the Returned and Services League of Australia and one of the historians at the Australian War Memorial, for allegedly exaggerating discontent in the Australian Army. Dan van der Vat in The Guardian called it "even-handed", "refreshing" and "sensitive" and praised the language used. The Spectator called it "brilliant" and praised his telling of the human side of the story.

Hastings wrote a column for the Daily Mail between 2002 and 2008 and often contributes articles to other publications such as The Guardian, and The Sunday Times. He also currently writes a bimonthly column for Bloomberg Opinion.

Personal life 
Hastings lives near Hungerford, Berkshire, with his second wife, Penelope, whom he married in 1999. Hastings has a surviving son and daughter by his first wife, Patricia Edmondson, to whom he was married from 1972 until 1994. In 2000, his 27-year-old first son, Charles, died by suicide in Ningbo, China. He dedicated his book Nemesis: The Battle for Japan 1944–45, which was published in 2007, to Charles's memory.

Political views
Hastings has at different times voted for all three major British Political parties. He announced his support for the Conservative Party at the 2010 general election, having previously voted for the Labour Party at the 1997 and 2001 general elections. He said that "four terms are too many for any government" and described Gordon Brown as "wholly psychologically unfit to be Prime Minister". At elections since he has voted for the Liberal Democrats.

In August 2014, Hastings was one of 200 public figures who were signatories to a letter to The Guardian opposing Scottish independence in the run-up to September's referendum on that issue.

In June 2019, Hastings described Boris Johnson, the Conservative Party leadership candidate, as "unfit for national office, because it seems he cares for no interest save his own fame and gratification ... [his] premiership will almost certainly reveal a contempt for rules, precedent, order and stability ... If the price of Johnson proves to be Corbyn, blame will rest with the Conservative party, which is about to foist a tasteless joke upon the British people – who will not find it funny for long." He has continued along this line of argument throughout the Johnson premiership and he said that "the experiment in celebrity government to which the Conservative Party committed us has failed, and is seen by the world to have failed. The foremost task for a successor is to restore Britain's reputation as a serious country."

In his Bloomberg column on 14 February 2021, Hastings wrote that the United Kingdom's future was unlikely to be long-term. He advocated a United Ireland but said he was against Scottish and Welsh independence. Hastings was widely criticised for stating in the article that the Welsh language was of "marginal value" and that Wales could not succeed as an independent country because it was "dependent on English largesse". Huw Edwards said there were several factual errors in Hastings' points, while Fergus Llewelyn Turtle responded: "For the non-English part of the UK that is ... the most integrated with England, it's pretty astonishing how many English commentators have exactly zero political clue about Wales."

In March 2021, Hastings wrote that the prospect of a showdown between the United States and China over Taiwan was becoming increasingly likely.

Select bibliography

Reportage 
 America 1968: The Fire this Time (Gollancz, 1969) 
 Ulster 1969: The Struggle for Civil Rights in Northern Ireland (Gollancz, 1970) 
 The Battle for the Falklands (with Simon Jenkins) (W W Norton, 1983) , (Michael Joseph, 1983)

Biography 
 Montrose: The King's Champion (Gollancz, 1977) 
 Yoni: Hero of Entebbe: Life of Yonathan Netanyahu (Weidenfeld & Nicolson, 1980)

Autobiography 
 Going to the Wars (Macmillan, 2000) 
 Editor: A Memoir (Macmillan, 2002) 
 Did You Really Shoot the Television?: A Family Fable (London, HarperPress, 2010)

History 
 Bomber Command (Michael Joseph, 1979) 
 The Battle of Britain (with Len Deighton) (Jonathan Cape, 1980) 
 Das Reich: Resistance and the March of the Second SS Panzer Division Through France, June 1944 (Michael Joseph, 1981) , (Henry Holt & Co, 1982) 
 Overlord: D-Day and the Battle for Normandy (Simon & Schuster, 1984) 
 Victory in Europe (Weidenfeld & Nicolson, 1985)   (Little Brown & C, 1992) 
 The Korean War (Michael Joseph, 1987) , (Simon & Schuster, 1987) 
 Armageddon: The Battle for Germany 1944–45 (Macmillan, 2004) 
 Warriors: Exceptional Tales from the Battlefield (HarperPress [UK], 2005) 
 Nemesis: The Battle for Japan 1944–45 (HarperPress [UK], October 2007)  (re-titled Retribution: The Battle for Japan, 1944–45 for US release Knopf )
 Finest Years: Churchill as Warlord 1940–45 (London, HarperPress, 2009)  (re-titled Winston's War: Churchill, 1940–1945 for US release by Knopf, 2010)
 All Hell Let Loose: The World At War 1939–1945 (London, HarperPress, 29 September 2011)  (re-titled Inferno: The World At War, 1939–1945 for US release by Knopf, 1 November 2011, . 729 pp)
 Catastrophe: Europe Goes to War 1914 (London, Knopf Press, 24 September 2013) , 640 pp.
 The Secret War: Spies, Codes And Guerrillas 1939–45 (London: William Collins, 2015) 
 Vietnam: An Epic Tragedy 1945–1975 (William Collins, 2018) 
 Chastise: The Dambusters Story 1943 (William Collins, 2019) 
 Operation Pedestal: The Fleet that Battled to Malta 1942 (William Collins, 2021) 
 Abyss: The Cuban Missile Crisis 1962 (William Collins, 2022)

Countryside writing 
 Outside Days (Michael Joseph, 1989) 
 Scattered Shots (Macmillan, 1999) 
 Country Fair (HarperCollins, October 2005) . 288 pp

Anthology 
 The Oxford Book of Military Anecdotes (ed.) (Oxford University Press, 1985) 
 Soldiers: Great Stories of War and Peace (William Collins, 2021)

Journalism

Filmography
 Wellington Bomber, 2010 BBC documentary
 The Necessary War, 2014 BBC documentary on the Centennial of the beginning of the First World War.

See also
 Clan Macdonald of Sleat

References

External links
 
 
 
 

Profile, debretts.com; accessed 2 April 2014.
 Archive of Hastings' articles, The Guardian; accessed 2 April 2014.
 Interview re "Editor: A Memoir", guardian.co.uk; accessed 2 April 2014.
 Profile, pritzkermilitary.org; accessed 2 April 2014.
 Interview on Inferno, Pritzker Military Museum & Library, 16 November 2011; accessed 2 April 2014.
 Winston's War, Pritzker Military Museum & Library, 17 March 2010; accessed 2 April 2014.
 Interview on Retribution: The Battle for Japan, 1944–45, Pritzker Military Museum & Library, 1 May 2008; accessed 2 April 2014
 Interview on Armageddon: The Battle for Germany, 1944–1945], Pritzker Military Museum & Library, 30 November 2004; accessed 2 April 2014.

Living people
1945 births
People from Hungerford
People educated at Charterhouse School
Alumni of University College, Oxford
British people of the Falklands War
English male journalists
English military writers
English newspaper editors
English columnists
Writers from London
Fellows of King's College London
Fellows of the Royal Society of Literature
Fellows of the Royal Historical Society
The Guardian journalists
English war correspondents
London Evening Standard people
Knights Bachelor
20th-century English writers
21st-century English writers